Chit Chan Gunn,  is the founder and president of The Institute for the Study and Treatment of Pain (iSTOP) in Vancouver, British Columbia, Canada, a not-for-profit information centre for Gunn Intramuscular Stimulation (IMS). Dr. Gunn developed a process called Intramuscular Stimulation (IMS) to treat neuropathic pain. In 2001 Dr Gunn was inducted into the Order of British Columbia and in 2002 into the Order of Canada for his contributions in the field of pain study. He is a clinical professor at the University of Washington.  

Dr. Gunn has been invited to lecture internationally on his approaches to pain therapy. His winning paper "Prespondylosis" and Some Pain Syndromes Following Denervation Supersensitivity" receiving special recognition at the 1979 Volvo Competition in Goteborg, Sweden. 

The Gunn Approach to the Treatment of Chronic Pain: Intramuscular Stimulation for Myofascial Pain of Radiculopathic Origin "red book" has been translated into many languages. His indexed published works continue to show international reach, multi-disciplinary medical scope. 

Gunn IMS teaching program has run continuously since 1994. Since 2013, the Gunn IMS training program has been part of the University of British Columbia (UBC) Faculty of Medicine and is located in the Chan Gunn Pavilion on the UBC Vancouver campus. The course is coordinated by the UBC Division of Sport & Exercise Medicine in the Department of Family Practice and is held across Canada.

He is also the founding director and past president of the Canadian Society of Asian Arts

IMS 
Intramuscular Stimulation, or 'dry needling', is a diagnostic and treatment model for myofascial pain of neuropathic origin. It works by stimulating spinal reflexes that reverse muscle contractures (shortened muscles) through the use of fine flexible acupuncture style needles. Although shortened muscles are impossible to see in MRI or X-ray images, trained IMS practitioners are able to feel tense muscles and target irritated nerves.  

What is IMS? patient information translation is available in over 100 languages.

Trigger Point Dry Needling An Evidence and Clinical-Based Approach (Chapter 15 E-book) Chapter 14 by authors Steven R. Goodman MD, Cory B. Choma PT provides description of the Gunn IMS modality of treatment.

Awards 

2015 - Chinese Canadian Legend Award

2001 - Order of Canada

2001 - Order of British Columbia

1997 - Honorary Fellow Peterhouse

Acknowledgements

References

External links 
 The Institute for the Study and Treatment of Pain - Legacy website iSTOP.org - 600+ backlinks
 The Institute for the Study and Treatment of Pain - New website CGIMS International Directory Gunn IMS Practitioners iSTOP.wildapricot.org
 University of British Columbia Gunn Intramuscular Stimulation (CGIMS) - Profile
 University of Washington Medicine Anesthesiology & Pain Medicine, Courtesy Faculty - Biographical Summary
 Published works - PubMed - Gunn CC
 Published works - "Red Book" Translations
 Published works - Google Scholar - CC Gunn - Citations Index
 2001 Award recipient - Order of Canada - citation
 2001 Award recipient - Order of British Columbia - citation
 Chinese Canadian Legend Award (CCLA) Asian Business Network Association Chinese Web Chinese PDF 
Author: The Gunn approach to the treatment of chronic pain : intramuscular stimulation for myofascial pain of radiculopathic origin -  - WorldCat
Contributing Author: Oxford Textbook of Musculoskeletal Medicine, 2nd Edition, Part 4: Management Strategies, Chapter 58 - Soft Tissue Pain: Treatment with Stimulation-Produced Analgesia, Oxford University Press -   Table of Contents Preview Chapter 58 
A new home for sports medicine, with help from a pioneering physician - UBC Medicine Magazine Summer 2015
Pioneering pain management Dec 1, 2011 - by Brian Kladko UBC News

What is IMS? A New Understanding of Chronic Pain - ISSUU 4 page brochure 
Peterhouse Profile: An Interview with Dr. Chan Gunn - Q&A
Pain relief pioneer donates $5 million for new UBC sport and exercise medicine centre - Media Release | March 4, 2015
UBC Campus and Community Planning, Projects Under Construction, Chan Gunn Sports Medicine Pavilion - Development Permit DP15034
UBC Faculty of Medicine, Allan McGavin Sports Medicine Centre, Department of Family Practice - A PROGRESSIVE FACILITY FOR A GROWING FIELD
Celebration Book: Chinese Canadian Legacies in British Columbia -  - PDF
Interviews with Dr. Gunn, Gunn IMS lectures, IMS treatment demos - YouTube

University of Washington faculty
Members of the Order of Canada
Members of the Order of British Columbia
Living people
Year of birth missing (living people)